Remitly is an online remittance service based in Seattle, United States that offers international money transfers to over 135 countries. It was founded in 2011 by Matthew Oppenheimer, Josh Hug, and Shivaas Gulati and became publicly traded on the Nasdaq exchange in September 2021.

History
Remitly was founded in 2011 as BeamIt Mobile. The company was initially a search engine for remittance services but shifted into money transfers soon after. It changed its name from BeamIt to Remitly in August 2012.

In April 2013, Remitly announced that it would allow its users to send free money transfers to the Philippines. This was the first international country to which the company could deliver money transfers. In 2017, the company's services became available in all 50 states in the U.S., with Massachusetts being the final state that Remitly was allowed to operate in.< By March 2018, Remitly had expanded its services to allow people from the United States, United Kingdom, Canada, and Australia to send money to the Philippines, India, Mexico, Colombia, Ecuador, El Salvador, Guatemala, Honduras, Nicaragua, and Peru.

Remitly became publicly traded on the Nasdaq exchange on September 23, 2021. The company's initial public offering of seven million shares generated approximately $300 million in new funding.

Services
Remitly allowed people in 17 countries to carry out transfers of money in approximately 75 currencies to 115 different countries, as of September 2021. The service operates electronically rather than via physical premises. Recipients in many countries can receive funds via mobile money and cash pickup at bank and postal office branches.

References

American companies established in 2011
Online remittance providers
Foreign exchange companies
Electronic funds transfer
Financial services companies of the United States